Balha is a constituency of the Uttar Pradesh Legislative Assembly covering the city of Balha in the Bahraich district of Uttar Pradesh, India.

Balha is one of five assembly constituencies in the Bahraich Lok Sabha constituency. Since 2008, this assembly constituency is numbered 282 amongst 403 constituencies.

Current MLA is Saroj Sonkar of Bharatiya Janta Party who won in the 2022 Uttar Pradesh Legislative Assembly election.

Election results

2022

2019 Bypoll

2017

References

External links
 

Assembly constituencies of Uttar Pradesh
Politics of Bahraich district